Naan is a leavened, oven-baked or tawa-fried flatbread which is found in the cuisines mainly of Western Asia, Central Asia, Indian subcontinent, Indonesia, Malaysia,  Myanmar, and the Caribbean.

Etymology

The earliest appearance of "naan" in English is from 1803 in a travelogue of William Tooke. 

The Persian word nān 'bread' is attested in Middle Persian as n'n 'bread, food', which is of Iranian origin, and is a cognate with Parthian ngn, Kurdish nan, Balochi nagan, Sogdian nγn-, and Pashto nəγan 'bread'. 
Naan may have derived from bread baked on hot pebbles in ancient Persia.

The form naan has a widespread distribution, having been borrowed in a range of languages spoken in the Indian subcontinent and also Central Asia where it usually refers to a kind of flatbread (tandyr nan). The spelling naan has been recorded as being first attested in 1979, but dates back at least to 1975,  and has since become the normal English spelling.

Varieties

Western Asia
Naan as known today originates from Mesopotamia, ancient Egypt, and South Asia. The most familiar and readily available varieties of naan in Western countries are those from South Asia. In Iran, as well as in other West Asian nations or ethnic groups in the region, from which the word originated, nân does not carry any special significance, as it is the generic word for any kind of bread.

Indian subcontinent
Naan spread to Indian subcontinent during Islamic Delhi Sultanate period, earliest mention of naan in the region comes from the memoirs of Indo-Persian Sufi poet Amir Khusrau living in India during 1300s AD. Amir Khusrau mentions two kinds of naan eaten by Muslim nobles; Naan-e-Tunuk and Naan-e-Tanuri. Naan-e-Tunuk was a light or thin bread, while Naan-e-Tanuri was the heavy bread and was baked in the tandoor. The Ain-i-Akbari, a written record of the third Mughal emperor’s reign also mentions naan and it was eaten with kebabs or kheema (spiced minced meat) in it. By 1700s naan had reached the masses in Mughal cultural centers in South Asia.

Naan in parts of the Indian subcontinent usually refers to a specific kind of thick flatbread. Generally, it is usually leavened with yeast or with bread starter (leavened naan dough left over from a previous batch); unleavened dough (similar to that used for roti) is also used. Naan, similar to some other breads of South Asian cuisine is cooked in a tandoor, from which tandoori cooking takes its name. This distinguishes it from roti, which is usually cooked on a flat or slightly concave iron griddle called a tava. Modern recipes sometimes substitute baking powder for the yeast. Milk or yogurt may also be used to impart distinct tastes to the naan. Milk used instead of water will, as it does for ordinary bread, yield a softer dough. Also, when bread starter (which contains both yeast and lactobacilli) is used, the milk may undergo modest lactic fermentation.

Typically, it is brushed with some water but in some other cultures such as those in the Indian Subcontinent, they brush ghee or butter. It enjoys a special position in the Indian cuisine as it can be used to scoop other foods and gravies or served stuffed with a filling.

A typical naan recipe involves mixing white or whole wheat flour with active dry yeast, salt, and water. The dough is kneaded for a few minutes, then set aside to rise for a few hours. Once risen, the dough is divided into balls (about 100 g or 3.5 oz each), which are flattened and cooked.

In South Asian cuisine, naans are typically flavored with fragrant essences, such as rosewater, khus (vetiver), or with butter or ghee melted on them. Nigella seeds are commonly added to naan as cooked in Indian, Bangladeshi and Pakistani restaurants throughout the UK.

Raisins, lentils and spices can be added. Naan is a natural marriage with Indian and Bangladeshi curries and gravies and can also be covered with, or served as a wrap for, various toppings of meat, vegetables, or cheeses. This version is sometimes prepared as fast food. It can also be dipped into such soups as dal and goes well with sabzis (also known as shaakh).

Indonesia
In Indonesia, naan is popular in Indian Indonesian and Arab Indonesian community as well as Malay, Acehnese and Minangkabau–with other variant of roti like roti canai. This dish usually locally known as roti naan or roti nan and cooked using Indonesian spices, such as garlic with local taste.

Myanmar
Naan bya in Myanmar is sometimes served at breakfast with tea or coffee.

China
The Jingzhou style of guokui, a flatbread prepared inside a cylindrical charcoal oven much like a tandoor, has been described as "Chinese naan". It is also an integral part of Uyghur cuisine, and is known in Chinese as 馕 (náng).

Japan
After being promoted by Kandagawa Sekizai Shoukou in 1968, which is now the sole domestic manufacturer of tandoors, naan is now widely available in Indian-style curry restaurants in Japan, where naan is typically free-flow. Some restaurants bake ingredients such as cheese, garlic, onions, and potatoes into the naan, or cover it with toppings like a pizza.

Elsewhere
Naan pizza is a type of pizza where naan is used as the crust instead of the traditional pizza dough. Chefs such as Nigella Lawson, and supermarkets such as Wegmans offer recipes for people to make their own naan pizza at home.

Gallery

See also

 Iranian Naans
 Sangak
 Taftoon
 Barbari
 Lavash
 Tandoor bread
 Tandoori roti
 Tandoori paratha
 Tandyr nan
 Bazlama
 Shotis puri
 Tonis puri
 Matnakash
 Paratha
 Parotta
 Afghan bread
 Indian breads
 Pakistani breads
 List of Pakistani breads
 List of Indian breads

References

External links

Afghan cuisine
South Asian breads
Yeast breads
Flatbreads
Persian words and phrases
Bangladeshi cuisine
Bengali cuisine
Pakistani breads
Indian cuisine
Indian breads
Indonesian breads
Iranian cuisine
Iranian breads
Burmese cuisine
Caribbean cuisine